The Tribune News is a weekly newspaper published in Junction City, Oregon, United States on Wednesdays. The paper serves Junction City and the tri-county area of Benton, Linn, and Lane counties, including the communities of Monroe, Harrisburg, and Santa Clara.

References

External links
The Tribune News (official website)

Junction City, Oregon
Newspapers published in Oregon
Weekly newspapers published in the United States